Touquin Aerodrome was a temporary World War I airfield in France.

Overview
As with Saints, Touquin airfield was hastily built during the Allied struggle to stop the (eventually last) German drive towards Paris across the river Marne. The first French unit arrived on 20 June 1918, followed by two other "escadrilles", then by the American 1st Pursuit Group, Air Service, United States Army on 28 June, with HQ and four squadrons. As it was summer, the field saw probably no more than a few tents, without any hangar to shelter the aircraft. All French units were gone by the 7 July, and the 1st Pursuit Group left for Saints on next 9 July.

On 25 February 1919, two French escadrilles arrived at the airfield, the last one leaving on 17 May, before the fields returned definitely to agricultural use.  Today it is a series of cultivated fields located south of Pezarches. The airfield was located to the south of the Départmental 231 (D231), with no indications of its wartime use.

Known units assigned
 Headquarters, 1st Pursuit Group, 28 June – 9 July 1918
 27th Aero Squadron (Pursuit) 28 June – 9 July 1918
 95th Aero Squadron (Pursuit) 28 June – 9 July 1918
 147th Aero Squadron (Pursuit) 28 June – 9 July 1918
 94th Aero Squadron (Pursuit) 30 June – 9 July 1918

See also

 List of Air Service American Expeditionary Force aerodromes in France

References

 Series "D", Volume 2, Squadron histories,. Gorrell's History of the American Expeditionary Forces Air Service, 1917–1919, National Archives, Washington, D.C.

External links

World War I sites of the United States
World War I airfields in France